Emmanuelle Lahouratate-Passard (born 27 January 1992) is a French ice hockey player and member of the French national ice hockey team, currently playing with HIFK of the Naisten Liiga (NSML). She has represented France at nine IIHF World Women's Championships across three levels: Division 2/1B in 2011, 2012, and 2013; Division 1A in 2014, 2015, 2016, 2017, and 2018; and at the Top Division in 2019. She competed with French national under-18 team at the Division I tournaments of the IIHF World Women's U18 Championship in 2009 and 2010.

Playing career 
Prior to her college ice hockey career, Passard played in the French national women's league with Pôle France and the women’s team of HC Neuilly-sur-Marne and in the Swiss Leistungsklasse A (LKA) with EV Bomo Thun. During 2014 to 2019, she played with the Montréal Carabins of CIS/U Sport and was a member of the 2016 U Sports women's ice hockey championship winning team.  

After her college career, Passard became the first French player to ever play in the Finnish Naisten Liiga after signing a one-year contract with HIFK Helsink for the 2019–20 seasoni. She was the team's leading goal scorer during the twenty game preliminary series and was recognized as Naisten Liiga Player of the Month for December 2019. In the ten game divisional series, she led the lower division in both goals and points, with 11 and 22, and was critical to HIFK's securing of a playoff birth.

Career statistics

Regular season and playoffs 

Sources: RSEQ, Elite Prospects

International

References

External links 
 

1992 births
Living people
French women's ice hockey forwards
HIFK Naiset players
Université de Montréal alumni
French expatriate ice hockey people
Expatriate ice hockey players in Canada
French expatriate sportspeople in Canada
Expatriate ice hockey players in Finland
French expatriate sportspeople in Finland
French expatriate sportspeople in Switzerland
Montreal Carabins women's ice hockey players
Sportspeople from Bordeaux